The South African Railways Class 2C 4-6-2 of 1910 was a steam locomotive from the pre-Union era in the Colony of Natal.

In 1910, the Natal Government Railways placed two Class A steam locomotives with a  Pacific wheel arrangement in service, built in their Durban workshops. In 1912, when these locomotives were assimilated into the South African Railways, they were renumbered and designated . The 2A and 2B classifications were never used.

The Class 2C was the second locomotive type to be designed and built in South Africa, after the Natal Government Railways 4-6-2TT Havelock of 1888.

Manufacturer
When more locomotives were required for passenger traffic on the Natal Government Railways (NGR) mainline on the section between Estcourt and Charlestown on the Transvaal border, where gradients were less severe than in the coastal region, two  Pacific type locomotives were built in the Durban workshops of the NGR and equipped with Type TJ tenders. The locomotive was designed during 1907 by NGR Locomotive Superintendent D.A. Hendrie as a redesigned version of his NGR Class A Hendrie A of 1905.

Characteristics

The Hendrie C, as it was popularly known, was similar to the Class A Hendrie A in general proportions, but with Walschaerts valve gear,  larger diameter coupled wheels, a larger boiler with a higher boiler pressure and a more enclosed cab which offered better protection to the crew. They were equipped with Hendrie's steam reversing gear and had wide Belpaire fireboxes, carried down between the rear frames which had been widened by using a bridle casting.

The cylinders were mounted horizontally since the Walschaerts valve gear did not require inclined cylinders like those on the Class A Hendrie A with its Stephenson valve gear.

Service

Natal Government Railways
When they were placed in service in 1910, they were also designated NGR Class A, with engine numbers 11 and 12. The two locomotives joined the two Class A Hendrie A Pacifics of 1905 on the section from Estcourt to Charlestown.

South African Railways
When the Union of South Africa was established on 31 May 1910, the three Colonial government railways (Cape Government Railways, NGR and Central South African Railways) were united under a single administration to control and administer the railways, ports and harbours of the Union. Although the South African Railways and Harbours came into existence in 1910, the actual classification and renumbering of all the rolling stock of the three constituent railways were only implemented with effect from 1 January 1912.

In 1912, the two locomotives were renumbered 765 and 766 and designated Class 2C on the South African Railways (SAR), after their popular Hendrie C nickname. The 2A and 2B classifications were never used by the SAR.

After serving on the Estcourt to Charlestown section for many years, they were transferred to the Witwatersrand for a short period, after which they were transferred to the section between Komatipoort and Waterval Boven in the Eastern Transvaal. Here they worked passenger and fast perishables trains until they were withdrawn and scrapped in 1936.

Illustration
The pictures illustrate two of the NGR liveries which were applied to these locomotives.

References

1220
1220
4-6-2 locomotives
2′C1′ n2 locomotives
NGR shop-built locomotives
Cape gauge railway locomotives
Railway locomotives introduced in 1910
1910 in South Africa
Scrapped locomotives